Malus asiatica also known as the Chinese pearleaf crabapple is a species in the genus Malus, in the family Rosaceae. It is native to China and Korea.

References 

asiatica
Crabapples
Flora of China
Flora of Korea
Fruits originating in East Asia
Taxa named by Takenoshin Nakai
Plants described in 1915